Ivan Bošnjak  (born May 17, 1982) is a Serbian professional basketball player who last played for BC Yambol.

References

External links
 balkanleague.net
 basketball.realgm.com

1982 births
Living people
Basketball League of Serbia players
BC Cherkaski Mavpy players
BC Yambol players
KK Lavovi 063 players
KK Vojvodina Srbijagas players
Serbian expatriate basketball people in Bulgaria
Serbian expatriate basketball people in North Macedonia
Serbian expatriate basketball people in Romania
Serbian expatriate basketball people in Ukraine
Serbian men's basketball players
Guards (basketball)